The Attorney General of the Isle of Man is the government's top legal adviser and has an ex officio (non-voting) seat in the Legislative Council and in Tynwald Court.

The Attorney General is a Crown officer, rather than a member of the Isle of Man Government. He is appointed by the monarch on the advice of the UK Secretary of State for Justice.

Walter Wannenburgh was appointed to the office in October 2022 following the death in January 2022 of John Quinn QC, who first held the post in an acting capacity until 2017, while Stephen Harding was suspended and after Harding resigned. Harding was charged with perjury and committing acts against public justice, but after two trials in which the juries were unable to agree a verdict, it was announced that no further criminal proceedings would be taken.

List of attorneys general
 John Quillin, 1765–1768
 Charles Searle, 1768–1774
 Sir Wadsworth Busk, 1774–1797
 William Frankland, 1797–1816
 John Clarke, 1816–1844
 Charles Richard Ogden, 1844–1866
 Sir James Gell  , 1866–1898
 George Alfred Ring, 1898–1921
 Ramsey Bignall Moore, 1921–1945
 Sydney James Moore, 1945–1957
 George Moore, 1957–1963
 David Leighton Lay, 1963–1972
 Arthur Christian Luft , 1972–1974
 John William Corrin , 1974–1980
 Thomas William Cain , 1980–1993
 Michael Kerruish , 1993–1998
 John Corlett , 1998–2011
 Stephen Harding , 2011–2012
 John Quinn ,
 acting, 2013–2017
 substantive, 2017–2022
 Walter Wannenburgh KC, 2022-

See also

 Justice ministry
 Politics of Isle of Man

References

External links 
 Official website of Attorney General

Government of the Isle of Man
Manx law
Isle of Man
Prosecution
Justice ministries